Eritrean Pidgin Italian  (or Italian Eritrean, as is often called) was a pidgin language used in Italian Eritrea when Eritrea was a colony of Italy (and until the 1970s in the Asmara region).

History

This pidgin started to be created at the end of the 19th century and was fully developed in the 1930s. It had similarities with the Mediterranean Lingua Franca.

In 1940 nearly all the local population of Asmara (the capital of Eritrea) spoke the Eritrean Pidgin Italian when communicating with the Italian colonists.

Until the late 1970s this pidgin was still in use by some native Eritreans, but currently it is considered extinguished (even if a few old Eritreans still understand it in Asmara).

About the Italian Eritrean Habte-Mariam wrote that: “[…] at the initial stage of their contact […] It seems likely that the Italians simplified the grammar of the language they used with underlings at this stage, but they did not borrow vocabulary and grammatical forms from Amharic and Tigrinya, since it does not show up in the 'simplified Italian' used today”.  Habte wrote that it was used not only between native Eritreans and Italians, but also between different tribes in Ethiopia and Eritrea.

The linguists G. Gilbert & Lionel Bender called this pidgin a "Simplified Italian of Eritrea" and wrote that:

"Simplified Italian of Eritrea" is definitely a pidgin; it is described by Habte as a “relatively variable form of Italian” (1976:179). Habte’s account of its sociolinguistic setting (1976: 170-4) and what we know of recent Eritrean history make it quite clear that it is not likely to become a creole, and in fact seems likely to die out within the next generation or two. 

For them the Simplified Italian of Eritrea "has basic SVO order; unmarked form is used for nonspecific; stare and ce (from Italian) as locatives".

Examples

The lexicon and syntaxes of the Italian Eritrean Pidgin was described by Saul Hoffmann in 

Examples:

 ; in Italian:   (in English: he has gone to the hospital)
 ; in Italian:   (in English: I have lost the money you gave me)
 ; in Italian:   (in English: I don't have the car)

Current situation of Italian

Italian is still widely spoken and understood and remains a principal language in commerce and education in Eritrea; the capital city Asmara still has an Italian-language school since the colonial decades. People born in Italy and who have children born in Italian Eritrea (who speak Italian and have formed communities in Eritrea) maintain associations of Italo-Eritreans in Italy.

Nearly 10% of the population of the capital Asmara is still able in 2018 to understand Italian and some old Eritreans still speak some words and phrases in Italian, according to the Italian ambassador. He pinpointed that some Italian words are commonly used in the Eritrean language, like "pizza".

Language characteristics

While phonology and intonation are affected by native Eritrean languages, including Tigrinya and Arabic, Eritrean Pidgin Italian is based on standard European form. The Italian lexicon in Eritrea has some loanwords of Tigrinya and Arabic origin (the latter especially includes Islamic terms). On the other hand, the Italian languages has given to the Tigrinya language many hundreds of loanwords.

Nearly five hundreds Italian words (including those from English, but originated from Italian during the Middle Ages) are used commonly in the Eritrean spoken in Asmara and surroundings, from "pasta" to "spagueti".

The following are a few of these loanwords:

Eritrean - Italian (English)

 asheto - aceto (vinegar)
 arransci - arancia (orange)
 bishcoti - biscotti (biscuit/cookie)
 bani - pane (bread)
 cancello - cancello (gate)
 dolsce - dolce (cake)
 forchetta - forchetta (fork)
 macchina - macchina (car)
 malmalata - marmellata (marmalade/jam)
 salata - insalata (salad)
 gazeta - giornale (newspaper)
 borta - porta (door)
 calsi - calze (socks)
 benzin - benzina (petrol/gasoline)
 balaso - palazzo (building)
 barberi - barbiere (barber)
 falegnamo - falegname (carpenter)

See also
 Mediterranean Lingua Franca
 Italian language in Somalia

Notes

Bibliography
 Bandini, Franco. Gli italiani in Africa, storia delle guerre coloniali 1882-1943. Longanesi. Milano, 1971.
 Bender, Lionel. Pidgin and Creole languages. University of Hawaii Press. Hawaii, 1987. 
 Habte-Maryam Marcos. Italian Language in Ethiopia and Eritrea, edited by M. Lionel Bender et al., 170-80. Oxford University Press. London, 1976
 Montesano, Giampaolo. La lingua italiana in Eritrea. CICCRE III editor. Asmara, 2014
 Palermo, Massimo (2015). Linguistica italiana;;. Il Mulino. .
 Parkvall, Michael. Foreword to A Glossary of Lingua Franca''. Corre ed. Milwaukee, 2005

Pidgins and creoles
Languages of Eritrea
Italian Eritrea
Languages attested from the 19th century
Languages extinct in the 1980s
Geographical distribution of the Italian language
Dialects of Italian
Extinct languages of Africa
Romance languages in Africa